Malaysia competed at the 1992 Summer Olympics in Barcelona, Spain. 26 competitors, all men, took part in 11 events in 6 sports. The nation won its first ever Olympic medal at these Games.

Medal summary

Medals by sport

Medallist

Competitors
The following is the list of number of competitors in the Games.

Athletics

Men
Track event

Badminton

Cycling

One cyclist represented Malaysia in 1992.

Road

Track
Pursuit

Points race

Hockey

Men's tournament

Team roster

 Ahmed Fadzil Zainal Abidin (GK)
 Paul Lopez (GK)
 Tai Beng Hai
 Suppiah Suria Ghandi
 Lim Chiow Chuan
 Sarjit Singh (c)
 Gary Fidelis
 Brian Jaya Siva
 Shankar Ramu
 Nor Saiful Zaini Nasiruddin
 Dharma Raj Kanniah
 Mohamed Abdul Hadj
 Mirnawan Nawawi
 Lailin Abu Hassan
 Soon Mustafa Karim
 Aanantha Sambu Mayavo

Head coach:  Terry Walsh

Group B

 Qualified for semifinals

Ninth to twelfth place classification

Ninth and tenth place match

Ranked 9th in final standings

Shooting

Mixed

Swimming

Men

References

External links
 Official Olympic Reports
 International Olympic Committee results database

Nations at the 1992 Summer Olympics
1992
Summer Olympics